Schwedes is a surname. Notable people with the surname include:

Gerhard Schwedes (born 1938), German player of American football
Scott Schwedes (born 1965), American football player

See also
Schwede, a surname

German-language surnames
Ethnonymic surnames